Solar Opposites is an American science-fiction animated sitcom created by Justin Roiland and Mike McMahan for Hulu. Originally created for the Fox Broadcasting Company, the project was shelved before being bought by Hulu and given a two-season order consisting of 8 episodes each. The series premiered on May 8, 2020.

In June 2021, the series was renewed for a fourth season. In October 2022, the series was renewed for a fifth season.

Premise
Solar Opposites centers around Terry, Korvo, Jesse, and Yumyulack — a family of aliens who crash land on Earth and are forced to stay there, often disagreeing on whether this is a good thing. The family comes from Planet Shlorp, an advanced alien world that sent out one hundred ships to colonize new planets shortly before its destruction. The show features parallel storylines, the most prominent of which follows a society of humans shrunk by the replicant Yumyulack and imprisoned in a terrarium known as "the Wall”. Starting in the third season, another storyline follows a group of intergalactic corrupt police officers, known as the SilverCops, that routinely arrest and brutalize Shlorpians fleeing from the destruction of their homeworlds.

Cast

Overview

Main characters

The Solar-Opposites

The Wall

SilverCops

Recurring characters

Alien associates
His only purpose seems to be to kill Korvo and Terry. In the second season, he is shown to be engaged to a human woman, he portrayed as a “bro” archetype, often expressing his fondness for The Hangover, Joe Rogan, and tight Polo shirts.

James Earl Jones High School
During the third season, his first name is revealed to also be "Principal", making his full name and title "Principal Principal Cooke".

The Wall

Episodes

Production

Development
On August 28, 2018, it was announced that Hulu had given the production a series order for two seasons consisting of sixteen episodes. The series was created by Rick and Morty cocreator Justin Roiland and Mike McMahan, who were also expected to serve as executive producers. Production companies involved with the series are slated to consist of 20th Television. On June 18, 2020, Hulu renewed the series for a third season consisting of 11 episodes. On June 22, 2021, Hulu renewed the series for a fourth season consisting of 12 episodes. On October 6, 2022, Hulu renewed the series for a fifth season.

Writing
The Wall in Yumyulack's room in which he keeps shrunken-down people as prisoners was, as Roiland has noted, one of the duo's initial ideas for the series, as they were interested in a "B-story" that lasted the entire first season. Some of the animation is made with assistance from Film Victoria in Melbourne, Australia.

Casting
Alongside the series order announcement, it was confirmed that Justin Roiland, Thomas Middleditch, Sean Giambrone, and Mary Mack would voice the lead characters in the series. In September 2022, Tiffany Haddish, who voiced the recurring character of Aisha in the first three seasons of the series, confirmed she had lost "all [her] gigs" following allegations of child sexual abuse, implying that she would not return in future seasons as the character.

On January 25, 2023, Justin Roiland was removed from the show, alongside sister show Koala Man, after he was charged with felony domestic abuse. Both shows are produced by 20th Television, via their 20th Television Animation division.

Release
The first teaser for the series was released on March 25, 2020. The official trailer was released on April 15, 2020. On May 8, 2020, the first season was released. In January 2021, along with a second trailer, it was revealed that the second season would premiere on March 26, 2021, on Hulu. Internationally, the series premiered on Disney+ under the dedicated streaming hub Star as an original series on February 23, 2021. On June 18, 2020, ahead of the season two premiere, Hulu renewed the series for a third season consisting of 11 episodes, which was released on July 13, 2022. Executive Producer, Josh Bycel confirmed Season 4 has been written, although Hulu has not yet shared a release date, it will likely be revealed in early 2023.

Syndication
The series premiered on FXX on July 30, 2022.

Other media

Music video

Video game
Solar Opposites were featured character players in the crossover racing game Warped Kart Racers, released to Apple Arcade in May 2022, along with characters from Family Guy, American Dad! and King of the Hill.

Merchandise
On January 27, 2021, it was revealed at the 2021 Funko Fair that new figures based on the series would be made, which were released on June 25, 2021. On November 17, 2021, Hulu launched an online storefront which featured merchandise based on select shows from its service, with Solar Opposites being one of them.

On July 22, 2022, at San Diego Comic Con that a 192-page art titled "The Art of Solar Opposites" will be released in early 2023 for $49.99 and will be published by Dark Horse Books.

Reception

Audience viewership
According to Hulu, Solar Opposites was the most watched program and the most watched Hulu Original comedy show premiere on the platform, following its debut on May 8, 2020, to May 12, 2020. According to Nielsen, Solar Opposites was the 10th most streamed original series across all platforms in the United States, during the week of March 22, to March 28, 2022, and the 7th during the week March 29, 2021, to April 4, 2021.

According to Whip Media's viewership tracking app TV Time, Solar Opposites was the 4th most anticipated returning television series of July 2022, and the 7th most streamed original series across all platforms in the United States, during the week ending July 24, 2022.

Critical response

Season 1 
On Rotten Tomatoes, season 1 has an approval rating of 92% based on reviews from 37 critics, with an average rating of 7.60/10. The website's critical consensus states, "Charming, hilarious, and surprisingly sincere, Solar Opposites revels in the ridiculousness of life while finding a few fresh things to say about humanity along the way." On Metacritic it has a weighted average score of 72 out of 100, based on reviews from 10 critics, indicating "generally favorable reviews."

Dan Fienberg of The Hollywood Reporter praised the animation of the series, acclaimed the performances of the voice actors, and complimented the humor of the show, writing, "Justin Roiland and Mike McMahan's new Hulu animated comedy Solar Opposites has enough loopy sci-fi elements to appeal to Rick and Morty fans and a distinctly adult sensibility." Alison Foreman of Mashable praised the dynamic and strong relationships between the different characters, drawing comparisons with other families coming from adult animated sitcoms such as The Simpsons while complimenting the humor of the show, calling it a "spectacular gem worthy of its own fanbase." Joe Matar of Den of Geek rated the series 5 out of 5 stars, praised the show for its classic sitcom format, acclaimed the performances of the voice actors, and applauded the comicality, stating that despite the comparisons with Rick and Morty, the series manages to stand on its own. Alex McLevy of The A.V. Club gave the show a B grade and called it "a mischievous cousin of 3rd Rock from the Sun" while saying it doesn't stray too far from the template Roiland set with Rick and Morty. McLevy feels the show is still finding its feet, but "Luckily, the humor is so reliably strong, the pacing so breakneck as it races from one plot to the next, that it's hard not to be won over by Solar Opposites avalanche of charm." Joyce Slaton of Common Sense Media rated Solar Opposites 3 out of 5 stars, writing, "Solar Opposites is an animated show by the brains behind Rick and Morty. It has the same style and vibe, including lots of edgy humor, cheerful gory violence, surreal visuals and plot twists, and wall-to-wall language."

Season 2 
On Rotten Tomatoes, the second season has an approval rating of 100% based on reviews from 14 critics, with an average rating of 8.10/10. The website's critical consensus states, "Solar Opposites successfully shoots for the moon in an ambitious sophomore outing that manages to build on the first season while adding plenty of fun surprises."

Jess Joho of Mashable found that the second season gives Solar Opposites its own identity, writing, "Roiland and other Ricky and Morty talent finally releasing themselves from the creative shackles of what works for that show, to find their own uniquely satisfying rhythm." Joe Matar of Den of Geek rated the second season 5 out of 5 stars, found it to be a "bigger, crazier, and funnier" season compared to the first one, and gave praise for its cursed language, references to pop culture, and level of violence depicted across its episodes. Davis Opie of Digital Spy rated the second season of the series 4 out of 5 stars, stating, "Everything that worked in season one is intensified here for the better," and claimed that Solar Opposites manages to be distinct from Rick and Morty across its humor and story lines, saying, "Solar Opposites is very much its own beast." Ethan Anderson of SlashFilm gave the second season a grade of 8 out of 10, stated it brings back the humor of the first season with a dark storytelling, and claimed it manages to be "bigger, crazier, and even more confident" than the first season.

Season 3 
On Rotten Tomatoes, the third season has an approval rating of 100% based on reviews from 7 critics, with an average rating of 8/10.

Lex Briscuso of SlashFilm called the third season of Solar Opposites "bright, bold, and, frankly, bananas in the best way," writing, "Solar Opposites has established itself as a spicy animated situational comedy that pulls from the best parts of its predecessor, Rick and Morty, yet doesn't get stuck looking for its place outside of the Adult Swim hit's shadow. The show is self-assured with a unique vibe and tone all its own, and that continues to shine in the third season. By leaning into the more human elements of what the series has to offer — both the base exploration of those concepts with the aliens and the desperate attempt at a reclamation from the wall people — season 3 of Solar Opposites reminds us that clever structure can give way to everything else you love about a story: clever writing, brash jokes, and pure cathartic connective tissue." Anthony Orlando of BuzzFeed ranked Solar Opposites 10th in their "17 Shows And Characters That Absolutely, Positively Should Have Received Emmy Nominations," saying, "Sure, this show may not be as good as Rick and Morty, but Solar Opposites is very much its own comedic beast. Co-creator Justin Roiland and his team inject the same amount of hilarity and creativity into this alien-centric show as he did with the former series. Also, the side-adventures in The Wall should've garnered some nominations by themselves, as they made for an outstanding show within the show."

Accolades

Notes

References

External links

 
 

2020 American television series debuts
2020s American adult animated television series
2020s American comic science fiction television series
2020s American LGBT-related animated television series
2020s American LGBT-related comedy television series
2020s American sitcoms
American adult animated comedy television series
American adult animated science fiction television series
American animated sitcoms
American comic science fiction television series
Animated television series about dysfunctional families
Animated television series about extraterrestrial life
Bisexuality-related television series
English-language television shows
Hulu original programming
Television series about size change
Television series by 20th Century Fox Television
Television series by Fox Television Animation
Television series by Justin Roiland's Solo Vanity Card Productions!
Television series created by Justin Roiland